Lalitha (16 December 1930 – 1982) was an Indian actress and dancer. She was the eldest of the "Travancore Sisters"—Lalitha, Padmini, and Ragini. She started her acting career in the 1948 Tamil film Adhithan Kanavu and has acted in movies of different Indian languages including Hindi, Malayalam, Tamil and Telugu. She entered films before her sisters, concentrating more on Malayalam films, and was mostly cast  in vamp roles.

Personal life
She was born to Thangappan Pillai and Saraswathi Amma  on 16 December 1930 at Thiruvananthapuram. She is the aunt of actress Shobana. Malayalam actress Ambika Sukumaran is her relative. Actress Sukumari was the trio's maternal first cousin. Malayalam actor Krishna is her grandson.

Partial filmography

Malayalam
 Prasanna (1950)
 Chandrika (1950) .... Dancer
 Amma (1952) .... Saradha
 Kaanchana (1952) .... Kaanchana
 Ponkathir (1953) .... Radha

Tamil

 Kannika (1947) ..... Shiva
 Adhithan Kanavu (1948) ... Pushumarasura
 Mohini (1948)
 Bhojan (1948)
 Gokuladasi (1948)
 Vedhala Ulagam (1948)
 Gnana Soundari (1948)
 Bhaktha Jana (1948) .... Kubja
 Vazhkai (1949)
 Deva Manohari (1949)
 Kanniyin Kaadhali (1949)
 Laila Majnu (1949)
 Maayavathi (1949)
 Geethagandhi (1949)
 Pavalakkodi (1949)
 Naatiya Rani (1949)
 Mangayarkarasi (1949)
 Velaikkari (1949)
 Vinothini (1949)
 Chandrika (1950)
 Ezhai Padum Padu (1950) .... Angela
 Manthiri Kumari (1950)
 Ponmudi (1950)
 Ithaya Geetham (1950)
 Krishna Vijayam (1950) .... Gopika
 Vijayakumari (1950)
 Marudhanaattu Ilavarasi (1950)
 Parijatham (1950)
 Digambara Samiyar (1950)
 Singari (1951)
 Sudharshan (1951)
 Manamagal (1951) .... Vijaya
 Or Iravu (1951) .... Shyamala
 Devagi (1951)
 Vanasundari (1951)
 Dharma Devatha (1952) .... Bijile
 Andhaman Kaidhi (1952)
 Amma (1952) ... Saradha
 Anbu (1952) ... Reeta
 Amarakavi (1952)
 Kanchana (1952) ... Kanchana
 Marumagal (1953) ... Usha
 Ponni (1953) ... Ponni
 Devadas (1953) .... Chandramukhi
 Ulagam (1953)
 Thookku Thookki (1954) .... Prema
 Kanavu (1954)
 Vaira Maalai (1954)
 Sugam Enge (1954)
 Valliyin Selvan (1955) ... Vathsala
 Menaka (1955)
 Kanavaney Kankanda Deivam (1955) ....  Nagarani
 Kaveri (1955) .... Amudha
 Ulagam Palavidham (1955) .... Indra
 Rajakumari (1955)
 Nalla Thangai (1955)
 Ellam Inba Mayam (1955) .... Guest role
 Madurai Veeran (1956)
 Rajarajan (1957) ... Priyamohini
 Pudhu Vazhvu (1957)
 Kanniyin Sabatham (1958)
 Thanga Padhumai (1959)
 Baghdad Thirudan (1960)
 Senthamarai (1962)
 Ellorum Vazhavendum (1962)
 1967 Nil N S Krishnan (1967)

Telugu

  Vijaya Gauri (1955)
 Ammalakkalu (1953) ... Usha
 Devadasu (1953) ... Chandramukhi
 Dharma Devatha (1952)
 Kanchana (1952)...Kanchana
 Navvithe Navarathnaalu (1951)
 Chandravanka (1951)
 Jeevitham (1950)
 Thirugubatu (1950)
 Beedala Patlu (1950) ... Angela
 Laila Majnu (1949)

Hindi

 Kalpana (1948)
 Kalpana (1960)

Sinhala

Surasena (1957)
Kapati Arakshakaya (1948) (Choreography only)

See also
 Travancore Sisters

References

External links

 http://www.malayalachalachithram.com/profiles.php?i=5758
 Profile of Lalitha at jointscene.com

1930 births
1982 deaths
Actresses from Thiruvananthapuram
Indian film actresses
Actresses in Malayalam cinema
Actresses in Tamil cinema
20th-century Indian actresses
Filmfare Awards South winners
Women of the Kingdom of Travancore
People of the Kingdom of Travancore
Actresses in Telugu cinema
Actresses in Hindi cinema